Allah Yarlu (also Romanized as Allāh Yārlū) is a village in Angut-e Gharbi Rural District, Anguti District, Germi County, Ardabil Province, Iran. At the 2006 census, its population was 93, in 17 families.

References 

Tageo

Towns and villages in Germi County